Mary Rozet Smith (December 23, 1868 – February 22, 1934)  was a Chicago-born US philanthropist who was one of the trustees and benefactors of Hull House. She was the partner of activist Jane Addams for over thirty years. Smith provided the financing for the Hull House Music School and donated the school's organ as a memorial to her mother. She was active in several social betterment societies in Chicago at the turn of the 20th century.

Biography

Mary Rozet Smith was born on 23 December 1868 in Chicago, Illinois to Sarah (née Rozet) and Charles Mather Smith. She was raised in a wealthy, privileged home, the daughter of the Bradner-Smith Paper Company president. As was typical of women of her social class, she did not attend university. As a young woman, she participated in activities usual to her social standing, as part of the Social Register and traveled extensively in Europe.

She became involved in Hull House in 1890, shortly after its founding, becoming one of its major financial contributors and serving as one of the trustees. Around the same time, Eleanor Sophia Smith (no relation) also joined Hull House and the women began collaborating on the development of a music school. Smith provided the financial backing to create the school in 1893 and hire teachers and Eleanor became the director of the school. In 1902, she donated a Hook and Hastings pipe organ in honor of her mother to Hull House for the music school.

In addition to her philanthropy at Hull House, Smith served on the executive committee of the Juvenile Protective Association of Chicago and was a contributor to the Henry Booth House, another of Chicago's settlement houses. She was also active on the advisory board of the social worker's committee of the United Charities of Chicago for the DeKoven District. Not all of her philanthropy was focused through organizations, as she was known to provide direct aid to families. In one instance, she paid for the education, including university studies, of three children for a mother who had fled from her husband. At this time period, women's groups and organizations often provided social services because governmental structure to do so was lacking. Smith was a member of many of these types of clubs, such as the Chicago Women's Club from 1888 and the Friday Club.

Smith was the companion and partner of Jane Addams for over 30 years and there has been much speculation of their life and relationship.  Addams burned many of their letters, but also referred to their relationship as a "marriage". They traveled together, co-owned a home in Maine, and remained committed to each other. In 1895, after Addams had suffered from a bout with typhoid fever, she went abroad with Smith, traveling to London. There, they visited several settlement houses, including Oxford House, Browning House, Bermondsey Settlement, and others. They proceeded on to Moscow and met Tolstoy, traveled through southern Russia, ventured into Poland, and visited Germany before returning to Chicago.

Early in 1934, Addams had a heart attack and Smith nursed her at her home, neglecting her own illness. Smith succumbed to pneumonia, fell into a coma and then died on 22 February 1934. Addams was considered too ill to descend the stairs to attend Smith's memorial service, which she could hear from her second-floor room.

References

Bibliography 

 

 
 

1868 births
1934 deaths
People from Chicago
Philanthropists from Illinois
American women investors
American social workers
Social workers
20th-century women philanthropists
20th-century American philanthropists